Thomas Hewes was a millwright, textile machine manufacturer and civil engineer professionally active in England from 1790 to 1830. He was born in Beckenham Kent in 
1768.

Early works
He installed the Boulton and Watt steam engine and associated millwork in McConnel and Kennedy's Old Mill, Ancoats in 1797.

Water wheels
In 1802 he was involved in building the mill, supplying the spinning machinery and erecting a 40 ft diameter iron water-wheel at George Allman's cotton mill in Bandon, County Cork, Ireland. It is speculated that he used iron in these mills in an early attempt at fireproof construction. The water wheel at Bandon was of iron- but in 1805 he built a wheel at Darley with a cast iron axle. He was involved in Belper in 1811 improving and replacing the wooden wheels used by Arkwright and Strutt. . These wheels were suspension wheels 21 ft 6in in diameter and 15 ft in width. The Belper wheel was controlled by a governor.

He supplied a wheel to Quarry Bank Mill in 1807, which he repaired in 1815 and in 1819 designed and installed the 'Great Wheel.

References
Notes

Bibliography

Millwrights
1768 births
Year of death missing